John McColgan (2 January 1898–unknown) was a Scottish footballer who played in the Football League for Portsmouth.

References

1898 births
Scottish footballers
Association football defenders
English Football League players
Vale of Clyde F.C. players
Albion Rovers F.C. players
Portsmouth F.C. players
Waterford F.C. players
Year of death missing